Prafulla Chakraborty was an Indian Bengali-language film director. His notable works are Jamalaye Jibanta Manush and Gali Theke Rajpath.

Filmography

References

External links 

Indian film directors
Bengali film directors